A hay knife is an agricultural hand tool: a long-bladed knife which may have large rounded serrations on the edge, or a smooth edge used for sawing off sections at the end of a stack or compact pile of hay or silage.  In the south of England hay knives may have smooth edges.

Hay knives are needed as loose hay or silage becomes compacted within a stack: to remove it a hay knife is used to make a vertical cut so that sections can be removed easily as the intertwined stalks are cut. The offset handle allows the user to work down a face. Once one section has been removed the worker starts again at the top creating another section to be removed.

Cutting tools
Mechanical hand tools
Farming tools